Season 2007–08 for Hibernian could be split into three distinct parts: a great unbeaten start to the Scottish Premier League season that temporarily took the club to the top of the league; a terrible middle phase which saw a long winless run and the resignation of John Collins as Hibs manager; and, finally, a modest recovery under the management of Mixu Paatelainen, who was appointed in January 2008. This took Hibs into the top half of the SPL, but short of third place and the UEFA Cup spot, which was won by Motherwell.

Pre-season
Hibs started pre-season training at a training centre in Austria, where they worked with fitness coach Roger Propos. At the end of the week they played SV Vöcklabruck in their first pre-season friendly. John Collins used this game to experiment, using 21 different players as Hibs lost the match 3–2.

Returning to Scotland, Hibs played a friendly against Brechin, which they won 2–0 with goals from Abdessalam Benjelloun and Clayton Donaldson. Four days later, Hibs routed First Division new boys Stirling Albion 5–0. Hibs then played their third friendly in eight days at the Almondvale Stadium, where they left it late against Livingston. Hibs eventually won 2–0 through goals by Steven Fletcher and Merouane Zemmama, who scored on a rebound from a penalty taken by Ross Chisholm. Hibs rounded off their pre-season campaign with two friendlies against Premiership opposition, beating Bolton Wanderers 3–0 and Middlesbrough 1–0.

Results

League season 

Hibs got the season off to a dream start by beating Edinburgh derby rivals Hearts 1–0 at Tynecastle. Brian Kerr, who was making his competitive debut for Hibs, scored the goal in the second minute. Hibs continued their winning start to the season, coming from 2–0 down to beat Gretna 4–2.

Hibs extended their unbeaten run with two draws, 0–0 away to Dundee Utd and 3–3 at home with Aberdeen. In the latter game, Hibs had to come back from 3–1 down after two clear mistakes by their goalkeeper, Yves Ma-Kalambay. Hibs then beat Inverness 1–0 in their next game, during which Ma-Kalambay saved a penalty taken by Marius Niculae.

Despite being unbeaten in the league, Hibs were expected to struggle in the next three games, as they were due to play both of the Old Firm. Hibs upset league champions Celtic at Easter Road 3–2, although they were aided by two clear errors made by Celtic goalkeeper Artur Boruc. Hibs then bounced back from their disappointing CIS Cup exit by beating Kilmarnock 4–1, mainly thanks to a hat trick by Clayton Donaldson. In the following match, Hibs beat Rangers 1–0 at Ibrox to temporarily go top of the SPL and extend their unbeaten league run to 10 games, including the last game of the 2006–07 season.

Hibs then started a dreadful run of form by losing their next two games against Motherwell and St Mirren. After a 1–0 victory over Gretna, Hibs went on a run of 11 games without a win in the SPL. By the end of 2007, Hibs had fallen out of the top six. This slump prompted the resignation of manager John Collins in December.

Mixu Paatelainen was appointed as manager on 10 January 2008. Hibs won their first game under him, defeating Inverness 3–0 in the Scottish Cup, but lost their first league game, 1–0 in the derby at Tynecastle. Hibs won four successive league games in February, defeating Gretna 4–2, Aberdeen 3–1, Inverness 2–0 and Falkirk 2–0. Hibs lost their next league game 2–0 against Celtic, but bounced back to win their next two games, 1–0 against Motherwell and 2–0 against Kilmarnock. This completed a run of 6 wins in 7 league games.

Hibs lost their next two games to Rangers and Motherwell, but defeated St Mirren 2–0 in their last game before the SPL split. Hibs guaranteed a spot in the Intertoto Cup by finishing in the top six at the split. This was because Falkirk, the only other SPL side who applied to enter the competition, finished in the bottom half of the table and therefore could no longer overtake Hibs. Hibs were in contention for a UEFA Cup place at this point, but then only took two points from the five games after the league split and finished in sixth place.

Results

Final table

Scottish League Cup 
Hibs started their defence of the CIS Cup with a 2–1 win over Queen's Park at Hampden. After the game, manager John Collins was quick to praise Filipe Morais, who scored the opening goal. They were drawn to play Motherwell at home in the next round. Hibs took the lead through an early goal by Clayton Donaldson, but Motherwell ran out comfortable 4–2 winners, ending Hibs' defence of the Cup and their unbeaten start to the season.

Results

Scottish Cup 
Hibs progressed to the fifth round of the Scottish Cup after a 3–0 win over Inverness. Dean Shiels scored a hat-trick.

They were then drawn against league leaders Rangers in the next round, and drew the first game 0–0 at Easter Road. Rangers finished the match with ten men after Allan McGregor was sent off for a professional foul on Shiels. The tie was replayed at Ibrox on 9 March, but Hibs lost 0–1 to a goal by Chris Burke while Hibs were temporarily down to 10 men due to an injury sustained by Ian Murray. Rangers again had a player sent off late on the match (Nacho Novo), but Hibs were unable to take advantage of the extra man.

Results

Transfers 

Hibs lost several key players in the 2007 close season. Star player Scott Brown was sold to Celtic for £4.4 million, while Chris Killen, Hibs' top goalscorer in 2006–07, also moved to Celtic. Ivan Sproule was sold to Bristol City for an undisclosed fee, estimated to be around £500,000. Defender Shelton Martis joined up with former Hibs manager Tony Mowbray at West Brom for £50,000.

Hibs manager John Collins made several signings in an effort to replace those players. These included the Bosman signings of Brian Kerr, Clayton Donaldson, goalkeeper Yves Ma-Kalambay and Republic of Ireland international Alan O'Brien from Newcastle. German youth international Torben Joneleit was taken on loan from AS Monaco. On the last day of the summer transfer window, Hibs signed striker Mickaël Antoine-Curier from FK Haugesund for a nominal fee.

During the January transfer window, new Hibs manager Mixu Paatelainen strengthened the squad by bringing in defenders Abderraouf Zarabi, Ian Murray and Martin Canning. He also signed midfielder John Rankin and striker Colin Nish. Unlike most of the summer signings, all of the winter signings, except Zarabi, had significant experience of playing in Scottish football. David Murphy was the only major transfer out during the winter, joining Birmingham for a fee of £1.5M.

Players In

Players Out

Loans In

Loans Out

Player stats 
During the 2007–08 season, Hibs used 30 different players in competitive games. The table below shows the number of appearances and goals scored by each player.

|}

See also
List of Hibernian F.C. seasons

References

External links 
 Hibernian F.C. Fixtures Guide - 2007/2008 Season, Hibernian official site
 Hibernian 2007–08 results and fixtures, Soccerbase

Hibernian F.C. seasons
Hibernian